Ecthyma gangrenosum is a type of skin lesion characterized by vesicles or blisters which rapidly evolve into pustules and necrotic ulcers with undermined tender erythematous border. "Ecthyma" means a pus forming infection of the skin with an ulcer, "gangrenosum" refers to the accompanying gangrene or necrosis. It is classically associated with Pseudomonas aeruginosa bacteremia, but it is not pathognomonic.  Pseudomonas aeruginosa is a gram negative, aerobic bacillus.

This type of skin lesion was first described in association with Pseudomonas aeruginosa by L. Barker in 1897. It was given the name "ecthyma gangrenosum" by Hitschmann and Kreibich.

It mostly occurs in patients with underlying immunocompromise (e.g. malignancy or HIV). Although most cases are due to Pseudomonas aeruginosa infection, there are recent reports of this skin lesion in association with other microorganisms, such as Escherichia coli, Citrobacter freundii, Klebsiella pneumoniae, various other Pseudomonas species, and Morganella morganii.

Signs and symptoms 
The primary skin lesion usually starts with a macule that is painless, round and erythematous. Then, it develops into a pustule, and then a bulla with central hemorrhagic focus. The bulla progresses into an ulcer which extends laterally. Finally it becomes a gangrenous ulcer with a central black eschar surrounded by an erythematous halo.

The lesions may be single or multiple. They are most commonly seen in perineum and under arm pit. However, they can occur in any part of the body.

Mechanism 
The organism enters directly through the breakdown of mechanical defense barriers such as mucosa or skin. Conditions which lead to the development of an immunocompromised state make the patient more susceptible to ecthyma gangrenosum and sepsis. In case of sepsis, the bacteria reaches the skin via the bloodstream. Defective humoral or cellular immunity increases risk, as the organism is not cleared from the bloodstream as usual. The main mechanism of the organism that is causing the typical skin lesions is the invasion of the organism into the arteries and veins in the dermis and subcutaneous tissues of the skin. This perivascular invasion leads to nodular formation, ulceration, vasculitis and necrosis due to impaired blood supply. Perivascular involvement is achieved by direct entry of bacteria through the skin or hematogenous spreading in case of sepsis.

Diagnosis 
Diagnosis is made by clinical observation and the following tests.

(1) Gram stain of the fluid from pustules or bullae, and tissue swab.

(2) Blood culture

(3) Urine culture

(4) Skin biopsy

(5) Tissue culture

Magnetic resonance imaging can be done in case of ecthyma gangrenosum of plantar foot to differentiate from necrotizing fasciitis.

Prevention 
The main organism associated with ecthyma gangrenosum is Pseudomonas aeruginosa. However, multi-bacterial cases are reported as well. Prevention measures include practicing proper hygiene, educating the immunocompromised patients for awareness to avoid possible conditions and seek timely medical treatment.

Treatments 
Treatments involve antibiotics that cover for Pseudomonas aeruginosa. antipseudomonal penicillins, aminoglycosides, fluoroquinolones, third generation cephalosporins or ceftriaxone aztreonam can be given. Usually, the antibiotics are changed according to the culture and sensitivity result. In patients with very low white blood cell counts, granulocyte-macrophage colony-stimulating factor may be given. Depending on the causal agents, antivirals or antifungals can be added.

Surgery will be needed if there is extensive necrosis not responding to medical treatments.

Recent research 
A recent retrospective study of all cases of ecthyma gangrenosum from 2004 to 2010 in a university hospital in Mexico shows that neutropenia in immunocompromised patients is the most common risk factor for ecthyma gangrenosum.

References

External links 

Bacterium-related cutaneous conditions